The UJ Stadium is a multi-sports stadium facility in Westdene, Johannesburg. It is mainly used for rugby games.

The stadium was used as an official training venue during the 2010 FIFA World Cup.

References

Soccer venues in South Africa
Rugby union stadiums in South Africa
Sports venues in Johannesburg
University of Johannesburg